Cho Se-jong (born 18 August 1978) is a South Korean sport shooter.

He participated at the 2018 ISSF World Shooting Championships, winning a medal.

References

External links

Living people
1978 births
South Korean male sport shooters
Running target shooters
Sportspeople from Incheon
Shooters at the 2002 Asian Games
Shooters at the 2006 Asian Games
Shooters at the 2010 Asian Games
Shooters at the 2014 Asian Games
Shooters at the 2018 Asian Games
Asian Games medalists in shooting
Asian Games silver medalists for South Korea
Asian Games bronze medalists for South Korea
Medalists at the 2002 Asian Games
Medalists at the 2006 Asian Games
Medalists at the 2010 Asian Games
20th-century South Korean people
21st-century South Korean people